The Seattle Mountaineers are a semi-professional basketball club and a member of the American Basketball Association (ABA). They are currently a touring exhibition team that plays against junior and community colleges within the United States and Canada. After four years as an IBL franchise, the Mountaineers jumped to the ABA in 2010 and applied and received non-profit status. Team owner, president and head coach Don Sims is a Christian. The club's basketball program provides an inclusive, Christian-based experience and teaches players the benefits of competition and understand its redemptive value.

History
The Mountaineers were established in 2005 and began play in the 2006 IBL season. After sitting out 2007 and 2008, the Mountaineers returned to the IBL for the 2009 season.

In 2010, the Mountaineers joined the NABL for the competition's inaugural season. However, they left the league mid-season and joined the American Basketball Association. They subsequently entered the ABA's Pacific Far West division and finished the 2009–10 season with a 16–11 record.

Season-by-Season

Source: Don Sims bio

References

External links
 Mountaineers' official website

American Basketball Association (2000–present) teams
Basketball teams in Washington (state)
International Basketball League teams
Basketball teams established in 2005
Basketball teams in Seattle
2005 establishments in Washington (state)